10 Summers is the debut studio album by American music producer DJ Mustard. It was released on August 11, 2014, by Pu$haz Ink, Roc Nation and Republic Records. The album, produced entirely by DJ Mustard himself, features guest appearances from several American rappers, such as Big Sean, Fabolous, YG, Rick Ross, Ty Dolla $ign, Lil Wayne,  2 Chainz,  Young Jeezy, Nipsey Hussle, Wiz Khalifa, Lil Boosie,  Yo Gotti, Iamsu!, TeeFlii, and Dom Kennedy, among others.

Release and promotion
On July 22, 2014, DJ Mustard unveiled the album's track list. On August 11, 2014, 10 Summers was released through Google Play for free during its first week.

Critical reception

10 Summers received generally positive reviews from music critics. At Metacritic, which assigns a normalized rating out of 100 to reviews from critics, the album received an average score of 74, which indicates "generally favorable reviews", based on 7 reviews.

Track listing
All tracks produced by DJ Mustard except where noted. Credits adapted from Spotify.

Notes
 "Can’t Tell Me Shit" is known as "Can’t Tell Me" on streaming versions of the album.
 "Vato" is not included on streaming versions of the album.
 "Tinashe Checks In (Interlude)" features vocals by Tinashe.
 "Ty Dolla $ign Checks In (Interlude)" features vocals by Ty Dolla Sign.

Sample credits
 "No Reason" contains samples from "Act Right", written by Mario Mims, Jay Jenkins, Keenon Jackson, Osten Harvey Jr., Paulo Ytienza Rodriguez, Roger Troutman, and Christopher Wallace, and performed by Yo Gotti.
 "Tinashe Checks In (Interlude)" contains an interpolation from "Other Bitches", written by Tinashe Kachingwe, and performed by Tinashe.
 "Ty Dolla $ign Checks In (Interlude)" contains a sample from "Show Me", written by Brian Collins, Christian Jones, Chris Brown, and Jeremih Felton, and performed by Kid Ink; and a sample from "My Nigga", written by Keenon Jackson, Dijon McFarlane, Mikely Adam, Daniel Wall, Jay Jenkins, Dequantes Lamar, Calvin Broadus, Awood Johnson, Craig Lawson, and Corey Miller, and performed by YG.

Charts

References

2014 debut albums
Roc Nation albums
Mustard (record producer) albums
Republic Records albums
Albums produced by DJ Mustard
Albums produced by Mike Free
West Coast hip hop albums